Nizhnetimkino (Tübänge Timkä) is a rural locality (a village) in Kabakovsky Selsoviet, Karmaskalinsky District, Bashkortostan, Russia. The population was 195 as of 2010. There are 4 streets.

Geography 
Nizhnetimkino is located 29 km northwest of Karmaskaly (the district's administrative centre) by road. Sikhonkino is the nearest rural locality.

References 

Rural localities in Karmaskalinsky District